Maholi  Assembly constituency is one of the 403 constituencies of the Uttar Pradesh Legislative Assembly,  India. It is a part of the Sitapur district and one  of the five assembly constituencies in the Dhaurahra Lok Sabha constituency. First election in this assembly constituency was held in  2012 after the "Delimitation of Parliamentary and Assembly  Constituencies Order, 2008" was passed and the constituency was formed  in 2008.The second elections were held in 2017.The constituency is assigned identification number 145.

Wards  / Areas
Extent  of Maholi Assembly constituency is KCs Pisawan, Maholi, Chandra & Maholi  NP of Mishrikh Tehsil; PCs Saraora, Godwa, Bambhaura, Rojaha, Jagana, Tihar,  Sahadat Nagar, Sohai, Baseti, Bibipur, Koraiya Udaypur, Jar, Arthalia Grant,  Keshawpur & Aliya of Aliya KC of Sitapur Tehsil (Sadar).

Members of the Legislative Assembly

Election results

2022

2017

2012 results

See also
Dhaurahra Lok Sabha constituency
Sitapur district
Sixteenth Legislative Assembly of Uttar Pradesh
Uttar Pradesh Legislative Assembly
Vidhan Bhawan

References

External links
 

Assembly constituencies of Uttar Pradesh
Politics of Sitapur district
Constituencies established in 2008